Thioredoxin reductase 1, cytoplasmic is an enzyme that in humans is encoded by the TXNRD1 gene.

This gene encodes a member of the family of pyridine nucleotide oxidoreductases. This protein reduces thioredoxins as well as other substrates, and plays a role in selenium metabolism and protection against oxidative stress. The functional enzyme is thought to be a homodimer which uses FAD as a cofactor. Each subunit contains a selenocysteine (Sec) residue which is required for catalytic activity. The selenocysteine is encoded by the UGA codon that normally signals translation termination. The 3' UTR of selenocysteine-containing genes have a common stem-loop structure, the sec insertion sequence (SECIS), that is necessary for the recognition of UGA as a Sec codon rather than as a stop signal. Alternative splicing results in several transcript variants encoding the same or different isoforms.

See also
 Thioredoxin reductase

References

Selenoproteins